The Democratic Front is a right-wing populist and socially conservative political alliance in Montenegro. It is currently composed of the New Serb Democracy, Movement for Changes and Democratic People's Party, with some other minor parties as the alliance's partners at the local level, while United Montenegro and Workers' Party are external members of the Democratic Front parliamentary group. The alliance was formed mainly to overthrow the Democratic Party of Socialists, the party in power from the introduction of the multi-party system until the 2020 parliamentary election.

History

Catch-all alliance (2012-2015) 
Miodrag Lekić led the alliance's list in the parliamentary election of October 2012. Lekić ran in the 2013 presidential election, supported by both his Democratic Front and the Socialist People's Party. According to the electoral committee's report, he was narrowly defeated by incumbent Filip Vujanović of the ruling DPS. However, many independent observers insisted that Vujanović's victory came about as the result of a massive electoral fraud. 

In March 2015, Lekić split from the alliance due to internal disagreements, having decided to form a new centre-right, moderate and pro-EU political party, DEMOS.

Shift to the right (2015-present) 
After Lekić departing from the alliance, the Democratic Front significantly changed its public appearance and radicalized its rhetoric and ideology. At the 2016 parliamentary election, DF came second, behind ruling DPS, with 20.32% of the vote with 18 seats won, remaining in opposition. On 9 May 2019, members of alliance leadership Andrija Mandić and Milan Knežević, along with 12 another people found guilty by the Higher Court in Montenegro for the "plotting to commit terrorist acts and undermine the constitutional order of Montenegro on the day of 2016 parliamentary election."

2020 parliamentary election 
On 3 August 2020, the Democratic Front alliance decided to sign an agreement with the Socialist People's Party, United Montenegro, Workers' Party, as well some minor extra-parliamentary parties, forming a pre-election coalition under the name For the Future of Montenegro, in order to participate at the forthcoming 30 August 2020 elections. The coalition common list for 2020 election is led by a Montenegrin university professor, Zdravko Krivokapić. Many media, analysts, but also political opponents have labeled the new coalition as the "Vučić's list", because major parties in the new coalition have very close cooperation with the populist SNS-led regime in Serbia, the largest number of constituents of the new coalition were present at several meetings in Belgrade during 2019 and 2020, organized by Serbian President (also the SNS chairman) Aleksandar Vučić, gathering "leaders of Serb communities" in Serbia's neighboring countries. The August 2020 election resulted in a victory for the opposition parties and the fall from power of the ruling DPS, which has ruled the country since the introduction of the multi-party system in 1990. The electoral coalition list won 32.55% of the popular vote, which equals 27 seats in the parliament, of which the Democratic Front member parties get 20 MPs. In October 2020, Democratic Front parliamentary club was joined by United Montenegro and the Workers' Party, while the Movement for Changes decided to form separate parliamentary group, under the name "Democratic Front - Movement for Changes". 

Since a political split with their candidate for PM, Zdravko Krivokapić, after he questioned their competence to participate in his cabinet, leaders of the Democratic Front, Andrija Mandić and Nebojša Medojević started to publicly criticize the alleged influence of the Serbian Orthodox Church, as well of the businessman Miodrag Davidović on Krivokapić's decisions and on composition of his cabinet, which they eventually supported in parliament after all. Mandić claimed that Krivokapić had been appointed head of the "For the Future" list after "pressure and conditioning of electoral support" by "parts of the Serbian Church", accusing parts of the church and Krivokapić of "acting on someone's orders from abroad", while Medojević stated that Bishop Joanikije Mićović and priest Gojko Perović set the terms of the church's support and threatened to withdraw Krivokapić from the electoral list, a few days before handing over the electoral lists for 2020 parliamentary election, which Perović categorically denied. During October and November Medojević and Mandić have repeatedly conditioned their parties' support for the Krivokapić Cabinet, if they were not part of it. Mandić explicitly asked Krivokapić to "return the mandate and that they would look for a new PM designate". Unfoundedly accusing and public insults were publicly condemned by the Serbian Church, PM Krivokapić, Davidović, but also by the DF's coalition partner the Socialist People's Party, while the True Montenegro left the parliamentary group of the Democratic Front, out the protest.

The DF maintains a very close cooperation with the right-wing populist SNS regime in Serbia led by Aleksandar Vučić, President of Serbia. Since mid-2010s, Vučić and members of his party have repeatedly publicly supported DF activities in Montenegro. In December 2020, Vučić, speaking to the media about Serbia future relation with the new government in Montenegro and PM Krivokapić, called DF leaders "sole true representatives of Serbian community in Montenegro". In 2021, Vučić even claimed the existence of a conspiracy that "many in Montenegro" allegedly want the "destruction" of this political alliance.

Elections

Parliamentary elections

Presidential elections

Members

Former members 

 Members of the Democratic Front's parliamentary group only.  Regional-level partner parties

Alliance leadership 
 Miodrag Lekić (2012–2015)
 Presidency (2015–present)

Presidency 
 Since Lekić's abandonment the alliance, it is led by the Presidency, which consists of six members, two representatives from all three major parties; New Serb Democracy (NSD), Movement for Changes (PzP) and Democratic People's Party (DNP). Since March 2015 members of the collective presidency are:

NSD
 Andrija Mandić
 Strahinja Bulajić

PzP
 Nebojša Medojević
 Branko Radulović

DNP
 Milan Knežević
 Predrag Bulatović

See also 
 2015–2016 Montenegrin crisis
 2016 Montenegrin coup allegations
 2019–2020 Montenegrin crisis

References 

2012 establishments in Montenegro
Conservative parties in Montenegro
Eurosceptic parties in Montenegro
Far-right parties in Europe
Montenegro–Serbia relations
Political parties established in 2012
Political party alliances in Montenegro
Right-wing populist parties
Serb political parties in Montenegro
Serb nationalist parties
Social conservative parties